The Bathouse Recording Studio is a recording studio located in Bath, Ontario, Canada. It is owned and operated by the Canadian rock band The Tragically Hip. Many influential albums have been recorded by artists such as The Tragically Hip, Sam Roberts, Bruce Cockburn, Hugh Dillon Redemption Choir, Blue Rodeo, Fred Eaglesmith, Sarah Harmer, Amanda Stott, The Trews, By Divine Right, the Arkells, Stripper's Union, Half Moon Run, and Matthew Good.

References

External links
 The Bathouse

Bathouse
The Tragically Hip